Tama is a city in Tama County, Iowa, United States. The population was 3,130 at the time of the 2020 census.

Tama is situated two miles south of Toledo, the county seat. The two towns are close enough to have nearly grown together over the years.

History
Tama got its start in the year 1862, following construction of the Cedar Rapids and Missouri River Railroad through the territory.

Tama is located a few miles from the Meskwaki Settlement, Iowa's only significant Native American community. Tama was located on the historic Lincoln Highway and is home to an original Lincoln Highway bridge, listed on the National Register of Historic Places. Tama is named for Taimah, the 19th century Meskwaki leader.

Geography

Demographics

2010 census
As of the census of 2010, there were 2,877 people, 1,092 households, and 708 families living in the city. The racial makeup of the city was 78.4% White, 0.5% African American, 5.8% Native American, 0.3% Asian, 9.7% from other races, and 5.2% from two or more races. Hispanic or Latino of any race were 23.6% of the population.

There were 1,092 households, of which 36.5% had children under the age of 18 living with them, 47.9% were married couples living together, 11.6% had a female householder with no husband present, 5.3% had a male householder with no wife present, and 35.2% were non-families. 29.0% of all households were made up of individuals, and 15.2% had someone living alone who was 65 years of age or older. The average household size was 2.58 and the average family size was 3.21.

The median age in the city was 35.6 years. 28.7% of residents were under the age of 18; 8.6% were between the ages of 18 and 24; 24.5% were from 25 to 44; 22.3% were from 45 to 64; and 16.1% were 65 years of age or older. The gender makeup of the city was 48.7% male and 51.3% female.

2000 census
As of the census of 2000, there were 2,731 people, 1,065 households, and 723 families living in the city. The racial makeup of the city was 87.04% White, 0.40% African American, 4.80% Native American, 0.40% Asian, 5.24% from other races, and 2.12% from two or more races. Hispanic or Latino of any race were 9.63% of the population.

There were 1,065 households, out of which 33.2% had children under the age of 18 living with them, 51.6% were married couples living together, 12.5% had a female householder with no husband present, and 32.1% were non-families. 28.1% of all households were made up of individuals, and 16.5% had someone living alone who was 65 years of age or older. The average household size was 2.51 and the average family size was 3.08.

Age spread: 27.4% under the age of 18, 8.1% from 18 to 24, 25.0% from 25 to 44, 20.7% from 45 to 64, and 18.8% who were 65 years of age or older. The median age was 37 years. For every 100 females, there were 91.2 males. For every 100 females age 18 and over, there were 82.4 males.

The median income for a household in the city was $35,531, and the median income for a family was $43,750. Males had a median income of $33,672 versus $22,237 for females. The per capita income for the city was $16,676. About 8.8% of families and 12.3% of the population were below the poverty line, including 17.3% of those under age 18 and 16.9% of those age 65 or over.

Healthcare
Tama-Toledo area residents have access to healthcare services at MercyCare Tama or Unity Point Toledo Clinic. When hospitalization is required the closest and most convenient hospital for residents is Grinnell Regional Medical Center or UnityPoint Health - Marshalltown Hospital.

Education
It is within the South Tama County Community School District.

Politics
Tama is the headquarters of the Sac and Fox Tribe of the Mississippi in Iowa.

Notable people 

 Vivia Belle Appleton, physician, medical missionary
Paul Bradley, retired MMA fighter
 Lance Horbach, member of the Iowa House of Representatives
 Andre Roberts, retired MMA fighter
 Bob Soth, long-distance runner who competed in the 1960 Summer Olympics
 Ska-ba-quay Tesson, Meskwaki artist
 Lewis Haines Wentz, businessman

See also

Impact of the COVID-19 pandemic on the meat industry in the United States

References

External links

 
Cities in Tama County, Iowa
Cities in Iowa